Krew Boylan (born 1982 or 1983) is an Australian actress. Boylan has appeared in different television programmes in her career, while she has appeared in many theatre productions. After initially filming only guest roles in ongoing series, Boylan secured a regular role in Seven Network's period drama series, Wild Boys. In 2010, Boylan portrayed the character of Mel in horror movie Primal. That year, the media dubbed her one of Australia's fastest rising stars.

Career
In 2006 Boylan was starring in the theatre production of The Sisters Project and featured her own player interval. In 2009, Boylan starred as a lead in the high profile theatre production, Bliss. Boylan played Oracle, the director Shannon Murphy stated that character was so central that the audiences were "actually watching the production through her mind."

In early 2010 The Daily Telegraph said that Boylan was the latest up and coming "it" actress from Australia. Boylan was then nominated for one of Cosmopolitan's "Fun, Fearless Female Woman Of The Year" awards. Boylan then started working on a production with Polly Stenham, titled Tusk Tusk. Cate Blanchett had personally chosen Boylan to appear in the production. She also continued with her career in theatre in the production of That Face, working with Maeve Dermody. Boylan also had a main role in Josh Reed's horror film Primal. Boylan played the character of Mel, a character who turns into a cannibal. Matthew Leyland of Total Film said that Boylan "downsized the fear factor" due to her appearance in the film, but added she approached the role well.

In 2011, it was announced that Boylan would star in Seven Network's period drama series, Wild Boys, as Ruby Rutherford. Boylan also made a parody music video titled "DUI Let's Get High". Alongside singer Priscilla Bonnet, they parodied two Hollywood actresses who drink and drive to become famous. The video was inspired by the personal issues actress Lindsay Lohan faced and celebrity blogger Perez Hilton promoted the video. It subsequently began to circulation on the film festival circuit and received a nomination at the 2011 LA Comedy Awards. In 2012, Boylan filmed for the role of Mary in the ABC television move Cliffy.

Boylan was cast as Schapelle Corby in the Nine Network's new telemovie, Schapelle, which aired in February 2014. Her role required her to undergo a drastic makeover. Boylan portrayed singer Lynne Randell in the 2016 miniseries Molly.

Filmography

Film

Television

References

External links

 

Australian television actresses
Living people
Year of birth missing (living people)